Luigi Bonazzi is an Italian prelate of the Catholic Church who works in the diplomatic service of the Holy See. He has been the apostolic nuncio to Albania since December 2020. He was the apostolic nuncio to Canada from December 2013 to December 2020.

Biography 
Luigi Bonazzi was born on 19 June 1948 in Gazzaniga, Italy. He was ordained a priest on 30 June 1973. He holds a Doctorate in Educational Sciences from the Salesian Pontifical University (Rome), and a Licence in Theology and in Canon Law from the Lateran Pontifical University (Rome).

He entered the diplomatic service of the Holy See on 25 March 1980. He served in the diplomatic missions of the Holy See in Cameroon (1980-83), Trinidad and Tobago (1983-86), Malta (1986-89), Mozambique, Spain (1991-94), the United States (1994-96), and Italy (1996-99).

On 19 June 1999, Pope John Paul II appointed him titular Archbishop of Atella and Apostolic Nuncio to Haiti. He was consecrated a bishop in Bergamo Cathedral on 26 August 1999 by Cardinal Angelo Sodano. John Paul named him Nuncio to Cuba on 30 March 2004.

On 14 March 2009, Pope Benedict XVI named Bonazzi Nuncio to Lithuania and Estonia. He was named Nuncio to Latvia as well on 25 March.

Pope Francis appointed him Nuncio to Canada on 18 December 2013. On 22 February 2019, a Canadian man, Christian Vachon, charged that Bonazzi's predecessor as nuncio, Luigi Ventura, had touched him improperly in July 2008 when he was 32. Vachon said Bonazzi called him the day he registered his complaint to discuss it.

On 10 December 2020, Pope Francis named him Apostolic Nuncio to Albania.

See also
 List of heads of the diplomatic missions of the Holy See

References

External links
Catholic Hierarchy: Archbishop Luigi Bonazzi

1948 births
21st-century Italian Roman Catholic titular archbishops
Living people
Clergy from the Province of Bergamo
Pontifical Lateran University alumni
Salesian Pontifical University alumni
Apostolic Nuncios to Haiti
Apostolic Nuncios to Cuba
Apostolic Nuncios to Estonia
Apostolic Nuncios to Latvia
Apostolic Nuncios to Lithuania
Apostolic Nuncios to Canada
Apostolic Nuncios to Albania
People from Gazzaniga